Zang is the Mandarin pinyin romanization of the Chinese surname written  in Chinese character. It is romanized Tsang in Wade–Giles. It is listed 112th in the Song dynasty classic text Hundred Family Surnames. As of 2008, it is the 241st most common surname in China, shared by 310,000 people, with the province with the most being Shandong.

Notable people
 Zang Tu (died 202 BC), King of Yan of the Han dynasty
 Zang Gong (臧宫; died 58 AD), Eastern Han general, Marquis of Langling
 Zang Hong (臧洪; died 196), Eastern Han general
 Zang Ba (c. 162–230s), Eastern Han and Three Kingdoms general
 Zang Aiqin (臧愛親; 360–408), wife of Liu Yu, Emperor Wu of Liu Song
 Zang Zhi (臧质; 400–454), Liu Song general
 Zang Maoxun (1550–1620), Ming dynasty playwright
 Zang Shiyi (1884–1956), Republic of China Governor of Liaoning, politician of Manchukuo
 Zang Qifang (臧启芳; 1894–1961), Republic of China Mayor of Tianjin, president of Northeastern University
 Zang Kejia (1905–2004), poet
 Zang Boping (臧伯平; 1913–2005), president of Nankai University, Deputy Minister of Education
 Zang Yuyan (臧玉琰; 1923–2005), singer
 Zang Cailing (born 1954), football player and coach
 Zang Jinsheng (born 1959), actor
 Sheng Xue or Zang Xihong (born 1962), Chinese-Canadian writer
 Zang Tianshuo (born 1964), rock musician
 Zang Haili (born 1978), football player
 Zang Jialiang (born 1988), Olympic curler
 Zang Yifeng (born 1993), football player
 Zang Wenbo (born 1996), figure skater

References

Chinese-language surnames
Individual Chinese surnames